Dominique Leach (born Humboldt Park, Chicago) is an American chef.

Life 
Leach grew up in Chicago, She studied at Illinois Institute Of Art - Chicago. She worked at The Renaissance Hotel Chicago, and  Four Seasons Hotel. In 2016, she co-founded the catering company "Cater To You Events & Drop Offs" with her wife Tanisha.

She opened Lexington Betty's Smokehouse. She developed a wagyu beef hot dog for Mariano's supermarket.

References 

American women chefs
Living people
Chefs from Chicago
Illinois Institute of Art – Chicago alumni
African-American chefs
LGBT chefs
American women restaurateurs